Qabus ibn al-Mundhir (Arabic: قابوس ابن المنذر; in Greek sources Καβόσης, Kaboses) was the king of the Lakhmid Arabs from 569 to 573.

His name is an Arabic form of the Persian name "Kavus", adopted under the influence of his Sassanid Persian overlords. He succeeded his brother 'Amr III ibn al-Mundhir (r. 554–569). Not much is known of his reign except that he suffered a heavy defeat at the hands of the rival Byzantine-sponsored Ghassanid tribe under Al-Mundhir III ibn al-Harith in 570. After his death, the Lakhmids were ruled by a Persian governor for a year, until Qabus' brother al-Mundhir IV ibn al-Mundhir (r. 574–580) ascended to the throne.

References

Sources
 
 
 

6th-century monarchs in the Middle East
570s deaths
Lakhmid kings
Year of birth unknown
6th-century Arabs
Vassal rulers of the Sasanian Empire
Arabs from the Sasanian Empire